Paavai Vilakku is a 1960 Indian Tamil-language drama film directed by K. Somu and written by A. P. Nagarajan. The film stars Sivaji Ganesan, Sowcar Janaki, Pandari Bai, M. N. Rajam and Kumari Kamala. It is based on Akilan's novel of the same name, serialised in the Tamil magazine Kalki. Paavai Vilakku was released on 19 October 1960, Diwali day.

Plot 
Thanikachalam and Gowri are a married couple, and they have a daughter named Kalyani. Sengamalam is a dancer to whom Thanikachalam is attracted, but they do not marry since he already has a wife. Devaki, a widow, is also attracted to him, but later starts to treat him as a brother. Uma, a friend of Gowri, stays with the couple and raises their child as her own. She too falls in love with Thanikachalam, but is not able to marry him. An accident at Thanikachalam's house results in the death of Kalyani; Uma is not informed of her death. She later meets with a similar accident and upon learning about the child's death, she dies in the arms of Gowri and Thanikachalam.

Cast 
Male cast
Sivaji Ganesan as Thanikachalam
V. K. Ramasamy
Sarangapani
Ashokan
Karunanidhi

Female cast
Sowcar Janaki as Gowri
Pandari Bai as Devaki
M. N. Rajam as Uma
Kumari Kamala as Sengamalam

Balaji, Prem Nazir, Sriram and Santhanam make guest appearances as Thanikachalam's friends.

Production 
Paavai Vilakku was a novel written by Akilan and serialised in the Tamil magazine Kalki. The film version of this novel was directed by K. Somu, written by A. P. Nagarajan, and produced by editor T. Vijayarangam and cinematographer V. K. Gopanna under the Sri Vijayagopal Pictures. Sivaji Ganesan's home, Annai Illam, also featured in the film.

Soundtrack 
The soundtrack was composed by K. V. Mahadevan, and the lyrics were written by A. Maruthakasi. The song "Aayiram Kan Podhadhu" is set in the raga known as Mand, and "Mangiyathor Nilavinile" is based on Subramania Bharati's poem of the same name.

Release and reception 
Paavai Vilakku was released on 19 October 1960, during Diwali. The film was distributed by Sivaji Films in Madras. The Indian Express wrote, "Despite the picture being crowded with a battalion of familiar faces, the total effect is pleasing and K. Somu's direction compels attention". Kanthan of Kalki said K. Sarangapani, Ramasamy and A. Karunanidhi gave light to the film. Facing competition from Kairasi, Petra Manam, and Mannathi Mannan, released on the same day, the film did not perform well at box-office.

References

External links 
 

1960 drama films
1960 films
1960s Tamil-language films
Films based on Indian novels
Films directed by K. Somu
Films scored by K. V. Mahadevan
Films with screenplays by A. P. Nagarajan
Indian drama films